"Tu Peor Error" (Your Worst Mistake) is a song recorded and performed by Spanish pop rock group La 5ª Estación. The song is the first radio single from the band's third studio album, El Mundo Se Equivoca. "Tu Peor Error" reached the #1 position on the Spanish singles chart in 2006.

Track listing
"Tu Peor Error" – 2:47 (Avila, Reyero)

Charts

Certifications

References 

La 5ª Estación songs
2006 singles
2006 songs
Songs written by Armando Ávila
Songs written by Angel Reyero
Song recordings produced by Armando Ávila